The 2016 BWF World Junior Championships is the eighteenth tournament of the BWF World Junior Championships. It was held in Bilbao, Spain at the Bilbao Arena between 2–12 November 2016.

Host city selection
Bilbao (Spain) and Yogyakarta (Indonesia) submitted bids to host the competition. Badminton World Federation later awarded the event to Bilbao while Yogyakarta was appointed as host for the next edition. According to the Indonesian delegation, the Spanish bid for the 2016 edition was approved due to fears of political instability should Bilbao awarded the 2017 edition.

Medalists

Medal table

References

External links
 Official website
BWF World Junior Mixed Team Championships 2016

 
BWF World Junior Championships
BWF World Junior Championships
International sports competitions hosted by Spain
Badminton tournaments in Spain
2016 in youth sport
Sport in Bilbao
2016 in Spanish sport
BWF World Junior Championships